Thumbscrew can mean:
Thumbscrew (torture), a screwed device formerly used for torture
Thumbscrew (fastener), a type of screw with a tall head and ridged or knurled sides, or a flat vertical head, intended to be tightened and loosened by hand

See also
Computer case screws
Wingnut (hardware), a nut with two large metal wings on, intended to be tightened and loosened by hand